The following is a list of publications from Street & Smith.

"Slick" magazines
Mademoiselle
Mademoiselle Living     (1947–1949) becomes:
Living    (1949–1959) continues by Conde Nast
The Popular Magazine
Air Trails Magazine later Air Trails Pictorial and Air Trails and Science Frontiers
Air Progress
Picture Play     (1915–1941)
Charm           (1941–1959)

Anthology series
Tip Top Library
New Medal Library

Adventure
Air Trails
All-Around Magazine
Bill Barnes Air Adventures
Do and Dare Weekly
Movie Action Magazine
New Story Magazine
Pete Rice Magazine
Red Raven Library
Sea Stories Magazine
The Skipper
The Wizard
Tiptop Weekly
Top-Notch Magazine

Detective and mystery
Clues
Crime Busters
Detective Story Magazine
The Avenger
Doc Savage
Mystery Story Magazine
Nick Carter Weekly
Old Broadbrim Weekly
The Shadow
The Whisperer

General fiction
People's

Romance
Love Story Magazine
Romance Range

Science fiction and fantasy
Astounding Stories
A Trip To Mars (1915) 
Unknown
The Thrill Book (1919)

Sports
Street & Smith’s Sports Annual
All-Sports Library
Athlete
NASCAR Scene
Sport Story Magazine

Westerns
Cowboy Stories
Buffalo Bill Border Stories
Buffalo Bill Stories
Far West Stories
Far West Romances
Pete Rice Magazine
True Western Stories
Western Story Magazine
Wild West Weekly

Young adult fiction
The Boys of the World
Bowery Boy Weekly
Live Girl Stories
My Queen

Comic books
Air Ace (20 issues, 1944–48)
Army and Navy Comics (5 issues, 1940–42; became Supersnipe)
Bill Barnes Comics (1 issues, 1940; became Bill Barnes, America's Air Ace)
Bill Barnes, America's Air Ace (11 issues, 1941–43; became Air Ace)
Blackstone, Master Magician Comics (3 issues, 1946)
Devil Dog Comics (1 issue, 1942)
Doc Savage Comics (20 issues, 1940–43)
Ghost Breakers (2 issues, 1948)
Pioneer Picture-Stories (9 issues, 1941–43)
Red Dragon Comics (5 issues, 1943–44; 7 issues, 1947–49)
The Shadow Comics (101 issues, 1940–48)
Sport Comics (4 issues, 1940, became True Sports)
Super-Magic Comics (1 issues, became Super-Magician)
Super-Magician Comics (55 issues, 1941–43)
Supersnipe Comics (44 issues, 1942–49)
Top Secrets (10 issues, 1947–49)
Trail Blazers (4 issues, 1941–42, became Red Dragon)
True Sport Picture Stories (46 issues, 1942–49)

References

 Publications
Street And Smith
Street And Smith
Street And Smith